Tu Ali or Tow Ali, also rendered as Toloo Ali or Tuali or Tuli, may refer to:
 Tu Ali-ye Olya
 Tu Ali-ye Sofla